The Catholic Worker Movement is a collection of autonomous communities of Catholics and their associates founded by Dorothy Day and Peter Maurin in the United States in 1933. Its aim is to "live in accordance with the justice and charity of Jesus Christ". One of its guiding principles is hospitality towards those on the margin of society, based on the principles of communitarianism and personalism. To this end, the movement claims over 240 local Catholic Worker communities providing social services. Each house has a different mission, going about the work of social justice in its own way, suited to its local region.

Catholic Worker houses are not official organs of the Catholic Church, and their activities, inspired by Day's example, may be more or less overtly religious in tone and inspiration depending on the particular institution. The movement campaigns for nonviolence and is active in opposing both war and the unequal global distribution of wealth. Day also founded the Catholic Worker newspaper, still published by the two Catholic Worker houses in New York City, and sold for a penny a copy.

History
The Catholic Worker Movement started with the Catholic Worker newspaper, created by Dorothy Day to advance Catholic social teaching and stake out a neutral, Christian pacifist position in the war-torn 1930s. Day attempted to put her words from the Catholic Worker into action through "houses of hospitality" and then through a series of farms for people to live together on communes. The idea of voluntary poverty was advocated for those who volunteered to work at the houses of hospitality. Many people would come to the Catholic Workers for assistance, only to become Workers themselves. Initially, these houses of hospitality had little organization and no requirements for membership. As time passed, however, some basic rules and policies were established. Day appointed the directors of each of the houses, but tried to maintain autonomy in the actual running of the houses. Because of this policy, the houses varied in both size and character: in the 1930s, the St. Louis Workers served 3400 people a day while the Detroit Workers served around 600 a day.

The Catholic Worker newspaper spread the idea to other cities in the United States, as well as to Canada and the United Kingdom, through the reports printed by those who had experienced working in the houses of hospitality. More than 30 independent but affiliated communities had been founded by 1941. Between 1965 and 1980 an additional 76 communities were founded with 35 of these still in existence today, such as the "Hippie Kitchen" founded in the back of a van by two Catholic Workers on Skid Row, Los Angeles in the 1970s. Well over 200 communities exist today, including several in Australia, the United Kingdom, Canada, Germany, the Netherlands,  Mexico, New Zealand, and Sweden.

Co-founder Day, who died in 1980, is under consideration for sainthood by the Catholic Church.

Beliefs

"Our rule is the works of mercy," said Dorothy Day. "It is the way of sacrifice, worship, a sense of reverence."

According to co-founder Peter Maurin, the following are the beliefs of the Catholic Worker:
 gentle personalism of traditional Catholicism.
 personal obligation of looking after the needs of our brother.
 daily practice of the Works of Mercy.
 houses of hospitality for the immediate relief of those who are in need.
 establishment of Farming Communes where each one works according to his ability and receives according to his need.
 creating a new society within the shell of the old with the philosophy of the new.

The radical philosophy of the group can be described as Christian anarchism. Anne Klejment, a history lecturer at the University of St. Thomas, wrote of the movement:

Family involvement 
Families have had a variety of roles in the Catholic Worker Movement. Because those donating funds to the houses of hospitality were primarily interested in helping the poor, the higher cost of maintaining a volunteer family (as opposed to maintaining an individual volunteer) conflicted with the wishes of those donating. Author Daniel McKanan has suggested that, for a variety of reasons, Dorothy Day's perspective on family involvement in the movement was controversial. Despite these elements of conflict, families have participated in the Catholic Worker Movement through multiple avenues: some assist the houses of hospitality while others open up a "Christ room" in their homes for people in need. There are many other opportunities for family involvement in the Catholic Worker as well, with some families running their own houses of hospitality.

See also

 Catholic Radical Alliance
 Catholic social teaching
 Catholic trade unions
 Catholic Worker, the movement's newspaper
 Christian anarchism
 Christian communism
 Christian left
 Christian socialism
 Christian trade unions
 Christian views on poverty and wealth
 Friendship House
 Georgism
 Industrial Workers of the World
 Liberation theology
 List of anti-war organizations
 Peter Maurin, co-founder of the Catholic Worker Movement
 Political Catholicism
 Settlement movement
 Saint Patrick's Day Four
 Pitstop Ploughshares

Similar Christian movements
 Anabaptism, in particular the emerging peace church movement
 Beguines and Beghards, medieval religious communities composed entirely of laity
 Christian democracy, particularly distributism
 Focolare, Catholic/Ecumenical movement promoting the ideals of unity and universal brotherhood. 
 Madonna House Apostolate
 "New Monasticism" related communities
 Peace Churches
 Servants to Asia's Urban Poor
 Labour Church

Notes

References

Sources

Further reading
 Dorothy Day (1997) Loaves and Fishes: The inspiring story of the Catholic Worker Movement. Maryknoll: Orbis Books, 1963.
 On the English CW, see: Olivier Rota, From a social question with religious echoes to a religious question with social echoes. The 'Jewish Question' and the English Catholic Worker (1939–1948) in Houston Catholic Worker, Vol. XXV n°3, May–June 2005, pp. 4–5.

External links 
 Main website of the Catholic Worker Movement
 
 Dorothy Day-Catholic Worker Collection at Marquette University
 The Way of Love: Dorothy Day and the American Right – by Bill Kauffman, Whole Earth (Summer 2000)
 Following Jesus in love and anarchy – The Times, February 29, 2008
 Maurin, Day, the Catholic Worker, and Anarcho-Distributism  by Nicholas Evans 2018

 
Anti–Iraq War groups
Catholic lay organisations
Catholic social teaching
Catholic trade unions
Catholicism and far-left politics
Christian anarchism
Christian pacifism
Christian radicalism
Christian organizations established in 1933
Dorothy Day
Distributism
Anarchist intentional communities
Christian communities